Below is a list of television series based on properties of DC Comics. This list includes live-action and animated series.

Live-action

From DC Imprints

Vertigo

WildStorm

TV specials

Pilots

Unscripted

Television commercials

Animated

From DC imprints

Pilots

TV animated specials

Motion comics

Web series, shorts series

See also
 List of films based on DC Comics publications
 List of video games based on DC Comics
 List of films based on Marvel Comics publications
 List of television series based on Marvel Comics publications
 DC Animated Universe
 Arrowverse
 DC Extended Universe
 List of unproduced DC Comics projects

Notes

References

External links
 TV at DC.com

DC Comics-related lists
Animated television shows based on DC Comics
DC Comics, based on
Lists of works based on comics
Television shows based on DC Comics